Mignanego is a comune (municipality) of the Metropolitan City of Genoa in the Italian region Liguria, located about  north of Genoa in the northeastern part of the Val Polcevera valley.

Geography
Mignanego borders the following municipalities: Busalla, Campomorone, Fraconalto, Genoa, Savignone, Serra Riccò and Voltaggio (this one in the Province of Alessandria, Piedmont).

It counts 4 (frazioni): Fumeri, Giovi, Montanesi, and Paveto  as well as 8 località: Barriera, Costagiutta, Migliarina, Pile, Ponte dell'Acqua, Ponterosso, Vetrerie, and Vittoria. Vetrerie is the most populated village and the municipal seat; it is sometimes identified simply as Mignanego.

References

External links

 Official website

Cities and towns in Liguria